Pseudomarimatha is a monotypic moth genus of the family Noctuidae. Its only species, Pseudomarimatha flava, is known from the western United States only in south-eastern Arizona and south-western New Mexico. Both the genus and species were first described by Clifford D. Ferris and J. Donald Lafontaine in 2010.

Adults are on wing from late June to mid-August.

Etymology
The generic name Pseudomarimatha is taken from the Latin pseudo (false) and Marimatha (the noctuid genus with which Pseudomarimatha has been confused and is likely to continue to be confused. The specific name refers to the yellow color of the forewings and body.

References

Noctuinae
Monotypic moth genera